Vladyslav Terzyul (18 June 1953 in Artyom, Primorsky Krai, Soviet Union – 17 May 2004), was a Ukrainian alpinist, one of the world's premier high-altitude climbers.

He is said to be one of the few people to have climbed all eight-thousander peaks and the first Ukrainian ever.  However this claim is disputed because he did not reach the highest point on Shishapangma (8027m), but instead stopped at Shishapangma Central (8013m).

Vladislav Terzyul died descending from the summit of Makalu on May 17, 2004, at an altitude of about 8300 metres.

Eight-thousanders
1993 – Kanchenjunga, east ridge, International Expedition
1994 – K2, Abruzzi route, Ukrainian Expedition/Odessa Alpine Club
1995 – Broad Peak Forepeak, west edge and north ridge, International Expedition
1996 – Gasherbrum II, classic route, International Expedition
1996 – Annapurna, northwest ridge, new route, Polish International Expedition
1997 – Nanga Parbat, 1997, Diamir face, Ukrainian Expedition
1999 – Everest, classic route from the north, Ukrainian National Expedition
2000 – Shishapangma Central, classic route. Ukrainian National Expedition
2000 – Cho Oyu, classic route, solo
2001 – Manaslu, southeast ridge, new route, Ukrainian National Expedition.
2002 – Lhotse, Odessa Alpclub expedition
2002 – Dhaulagiri
2003 – Gasherbrum I
2004 – Makalu, west ridge, died during the descent.

References

External links
 Vladislav Terzyul Web Site
 Climbing list
 The death

1953 births
2004 deaths
People from Artyom, Russia
Ukrainian mountain climbers
Soviet mountain climbers
Mountaineering deaths
Summiters of Mount Everest